Microtheoris ophionalis, the yellow-veined moth, is a moth in the family Crambidae. It was described by Francis Walker in 1859. It is found from southern Canada, through the United States and Mexico to South America.

The length of the forewings 5.5–7 mm. The wing colour varies from dark ochreous brown, rust brown with a well-defined subterminal line, to pale tan with brown subterminal lines. Adults are on wing from May to October in the northern part of the range.

Subspecies
Microtheoris ophionalis ophionalis
Microtheoris ophionalis baboquivariensis Munroe, 1961 (Arizona)
Microtheoris ophionalis eremica Munroe, 1961 (Texas)
Microtheoris ophionalis lacustris Munroe, 1961 (Ontario)
Microtheoris ophionalis occidentalis Munroe, 1961 (British Columbia)

References

Moths described in 1859
Odontiini